The seventy disciples or seventy-two disciples, known in the Eastern Christian traditions as the seventy apostles or seventy-two apostles, were early emissaries of Jesus mentioned in the Gospel of Luke.  The correct Greek terminology is evdomikonta (εβδομήκοντα) apostoli or evdomikonta mathetes.    

According to the Gospel of Luke, the only gospel in which they appear, Jesus appointed them and sent them out in pairs on a specific mission which is detailed in the text. The number of those disciples varies between either 70 or 72 depending on the account.

In Western Christianity, they are usually referred to as disciples, whereas in Eastern Christianity they are usually referred to as apostles. Using the original Greek words, both titles are descriptive, as an apostle is one sent on a mission (the Greek uses the verb form: apesteilen) whereas a disciple is a student, but the two traditions differ on the scope of the words apostle and disciple.

Bible text 
The passage from Luke 10 reads (in Douay–Rheims Bible):

Analysis 
This is the only mention of the group in the Bible. The number is seventy in some manuscripts of the Alexandrian (such as Codex Sinaiticus) and Caesarean text traditions but seventy-two in most other Alexandrian and Western texts. It may derive from the seventy nations of Genesis 10 or the many other occurrences of the number seventy in the Bible, or the seventy-two translators of the Septuagint from the Letter of Aristeas. In translating the Vulgate, Jerome selected the reading of seventy-two.

The Gospel of Luke is not alone among the synoptic gospels in containing multiple episodes in which Jesus sends out his followers on missions. The first occasion is closely based on the "limited commission" mission in Mark , which however recounts the sending out of the twelve apostles, rather than seventy, though with similar details. The parallels (also Matthew ,) suggest a common origin in the hypothesized Q document. Luke also mentions the Great Commission to "all nations" but in less detail than Matthew's account and  mentions the Dispersion of the Apostles.

He said to them, "When I sent you forth without a money bag or a sack or sandals, were you in need of anything?" "No, nothing," they replied.

Feast days 

The feast day commemorating the seventy is known as the "Synaxis of the Seventy Apostles" in Eastern Orthodoxy, and is celebrated on January 4. Each of the seventy apostles also has individual commemorations scattered throughout the liturgical year (see Eastern Orthodox Church calendar).

Lists of the disciples' names

Attributed to Hippolytus
A Greek text titled On the Seventy Apostles of Christ is known from several manuscripts, the oldest in Codex Baroccianus 206, a ninth-century palimpsest lectionary. The text is ancient, but its traditional ascription to Hippolytus of Rome is now considered dubious. An 1886 translation is:
 James the Lord's brother, bishop of Jerusalem
 Cleopas, bishop of Jerusalem
 Matthias, who supplied the vacant place in the number of the twelve apostles
 Thaddeus, who conveyed the epistle to Augarus (Abgar V)
 Ananias, who baptized Paul, and was bishop of Damascus
 Stephen, the first martyr
 Philip, who baptized the Ethiopian eunuch
 Prochorus, bishop of Nicomedia, who also was the first that departed, 11 believing together with his daughters
 Nicanor died when Stephen was martyred
 Timon, bishop of Bostra
 Parmenas, bishop of Soli.
 Nicolaus, bishop of Samaria
 Barnabas, bishop of Milan
 Mark the Evangelist, bishop of Alexandria
 Luke the Evangelist 
These two [Mark and Luke] belonged to the seventy disciples who were scattered by the offence of the word which Christ spoke, "Except a man eat my flesh, and drink my blood, he is not worthy of me." But the one being induced to return to the Lord by Peter's instrumentality, and the other by Paul's, they were honored to preach that Gospel on account of which they also suffered martyrdom, the one being burned, and the other being crucified on an olive tree.
 Silas, bishop of Corinth
 Silvanus, bishop of Thessalonica
 Crisces (Crescens), bishop of Carchedon in Galatia
 Epænetus, bishop of Carthage
 Andronicus, bishop of Pannonia
 Amplias, bishop of Odyssus
 Urban, bishop of Macedonia
 Stachys, bishop of Byzantium
 Barnabas, bishop of Heraclea
 Phygellus, bishop of Ephesus. He was of the party also of Simon
 Hermogenes. He, too, was of the same mind with the former
 Demas, who also became a priest of idols
 Apelles, bishop of Smyrna
 Aristobulus, bishop of Britain
 Narcissus, bishop of Athens
 Herodion, bishop of Tarsus
 Agabus the prophet
 Rufus, bishop of Thebes
 Asyncritus, bishop of Hyrcania
 Phlegon, bishop of Marathon
 Hermes, bishop of Dalmatia
 Patrobulus, bishop of Puteoli
 Hermas, bishop of Philippopolis (Thrace)
 Linus, bishop of Rome
 Caius, bishop of Ephesus
 Philologus, bishop of Sinope
 Olympus and ...
 ...Rhodion were martyred in Rome
 Lucius, bishop of Laodicea in Syria
 Jason, bishop of Tarsus
 Sosipater, bishop of Iconium
 Tertius, bishop of Iconium
 Erastus, bishop of Panellas
 Quartus, bishop of Berytus
 Apollos, bishop of Cæsarea
 Cephas
 Sosthenes, bishop of Colophonia
 Tychicus, bishop of Colophonia
 Epaphroditus, bishop of Andriace
 Cæsar, bishop of Dyrrachium
 Mark, cousin to Barnabas, bishop of Apollonia
 Justus, bishop of Eleutheropolis
 Artemas, bishop of Lystra
 Clement, bishop of Sardinia
 Onesiphorus, bishop of Corone
 Tychicus, bishop of Chalcedon
 Carpus, bishop of Berytus in Thrace
 Evodus, bishop of Antioch
 Aristarchus, bishop of Apamea
 Mark, who is also John, bishop of Bibloupolis
 Zenas, bishop of Diospolis
 Philemon, bishop of Gaza
 Aristarchus
 Pudes
 Trophimus, who was martyred along with Paul

Book of the Bee
Similar to an earlier list attributed to Irenaeus, Bishop Solomon of Basra of the Church of the East in the 13th century Book of the Bee offers the following list: 

 James, the son of Joseph
 Simon the son of Cleopas
 Cleopas, his father
 Joses
 Simon
 Judah
 Barnabas
 Manaeus (?)
 Ananias, who baptised Paul
 Cephas, who preached at Antioch
 Joseph the senator
 Nicodemus the archon
 Nathaniel the chief scribe
 Justus, that is Joseph, who is called Barshabbâ
 Silas
 Judah
 John, surnamed Mark 
 Mnason, who received Paul
 Manaël, the foster-brother of Herod
 Simon called Niger
 Jason, who is (mentioned) in the Acts (of the apostles)
 Rufus
 Alexander
 Simon the Cyrenian, their father
 Lucius the Cyrenian
 Another Judah, who is mentioned in the Acts (of the apostles)
 Judah, who is called Simon
 Eurion (Orion) the splay-footed
 Thôrus (?)
 Thorîsus (?)
 Zabdon
 Zakron
These are the seven who were chosen with Stephen: 
 Philip the Evangelist, who had three daughters that used to prophesy; 
 Stephen; 
 Prochorus; 
 Nicanor; 
 Timon; 
 Parmenas; 
 Nicolaus, the Antiochian proselyte; 
[the next three are listed with the preceding seven]
 Andronicus the Greek; 
 Titus; 
 Timothy.
These are the five who were with Peter in Rome: 
 Hermas [of Philippopolis]; 
 Plîgtâ; 
 Patrobas; 
 Asyncritus; 
 Hermas [of Dalmatia].
These are the six [sic; seven names follow] who came with Peter to Cornelius: 
 Criscus (Crescens); 
 Milichus; 
 Kîrîțôn (Crito); 
 Simon; 
 Gaius, who received Paul; 
 Abrazon (?); 
 Apollos.
These are the twelve who were rejected from among the seventy, as Judas Iscariot was from among the twelve, because they absolutely denied our Lord's divinity at the instigation of Cerinthus. Of these Luke [recte 1 John] said, They went out from us, but they were not of us;' and Paul called them 'false apostles and deceitful workers' 
Simon; 
Levi; 
Bar-Ḳubbâ; 
Cleon; 
Hymenaeus; 
Candarus; 
Clithon (?); 
Demas; 
Narcissus; 
Slikîspus (?); 
Thaddaeus; 
Mârûthâ. 
In their stead there came in these: 
 Luke the physician; 
 Apollos the elect; 
 Ampelius; 
 Urbanus; 
 Stachys; 
 Popillius (or Publius); 
 Aristobulus; 
 Stephen (not the Corinthian); 
 Herodion the son of Narcissus; 
 Olympas; 
 Mark the Evangelist; 
 Addai; 
 Aggai; 
 Mâr Mârî.

It is said that each one of the twelve and of the seventy wrote a Gospel; but in order that there might be no contention and that the number of 'Acts' might not be multiplied, the apostles adopted a plan and chose two of the seventy, Luke and Mark, and two of the twelve, Matthew and John.

Others
Other lists are 
 One attributed to Dorotheus of Tyre, completed some time before AD 811.
 One attributed to Epiphanius of Salamis

Matthias, who would later replace Judas Iscariot as one of the twelve apostles, is also often numbered among the seventy, since John Mark ("John, surnamed Mark", "Mark, who is also John") is typically identified with Mark the Evangelist.

Some accounts of the legendary Saint Mantius of Évora regard him as one of the disciples, having witnessed the Last Supper and Pentecost.

See also

 Life of Jesus in the New Testament
 Dispersion of the Apostles

Notes

References

External links

Luke 10 in Greek
 Luke 10 in Greek transliterated
 The Seventy Apostles
 The Book of the Bee, chapter XLIX "The names of the Apostles in order" by Solomon, Nestorian bishop of Basra, 13th century (edited by Ernest A. Wallace Budge, 1886)
 "Oldest Church" in Rihad Jordan Discovery "Ridiculous," Critics Say

 
Christian missions
Christian terminology
Followers of Jesus
Gospel episodes
Gospel of Luke
Groups of Eastern Orthodox saints
Groups of Roman Catholic saints
Lists of saints
Unnamed people of the Bible